Stolen Heaven is a 1938 American drama film directed by Andrew L. Stone and written by Eve Greene, Frederick J. Jackson and Stone. The film stars Gene Raymond, Olympe Bradna and Glenda Farrell. The film was released on May 13, 1938 by Paramount Pictures. The screenplay concerns two jewel thieves who pose as musicians to elude pursuing law officers.

Plot
The film has been called a "musical melodrama". A female jewel thief named Steffi, a.k.a. "Will O'the Wisp", robs a jewelry store with her partners Von, Rita and Bako. The thieves pose as musicians to throw the police off their trail.

Cast 
 Gene Raymond as Carl Lieberlich
 Olympe Bradna as Steffi
 Glenda Farrell as Rita
 Lewis Stone as Joseph Langauer
 Porter Hall as Hermann "Von" Offer
 Douglass Dumbrille as Klingman
 Joe Sawyer as Bako
 Esther Dale as Lieschen
 Charles Judels as Huberl
 Ferdinand Gottschalk as Lubert

References

External links 
 

1938 films
1938 crime drama films
American black-and-white films
American crime drama films
American heist films
Films directed by Andrew L. Stone
Films about pianos and pianists
Paramount Pictures films
1930s heist films
1930s English-language films
1930s American films